Sheharyar Ghani (born, 9 September 1985, Karachi) is an international cricketer from Pakistan. He was part of the bronze medal winning team at the 2010 Asian Games in Guangzhou, China.

Career

2010
In November, Ghani was part of the team at the Asian Games in Guangzhou, China which won a bronze medal by beating Sri Lanka in the 3rd place playoffs.

References

External links
 

1985 births
Living people
Cricketers from Karachi
Pakistani cricketers
Karachi cricketers
Cricketers at the 2010 Asian Games
Asian Games bronze medalists for Pakistan
Asian Games medalists in cricket
Karachi Zebras cricketers
Karachi Blues cricketers
Karachi Dolphins cricketers
Pakistan International Airlines cricketers
Medalists at the 2010 Asian Games